Badilloa is a genus of shrubs and small trees in the family Asteraceae.

Badilloa is native to the Andes of northwestern South America, from Venezuela to Peru.

 Species

References

 
Asteraceae genera
Flora of South America
Taxonomy articles created by Polbot